were a two-member Japanese independent band, who debuted in 2009 with the single "Postman John".

Biography 

The band was formed in 2008, with the members J.M. and Tadaomi Tōyama. J.M. was signed to an exclusive contract with Pinky fashion magazine, however the magazine disbanded in late 2009. Tōyama also works as a radio personality on Tokyo FM. Tadaomi Tōyama writes and produces the majority of the band's songs, with J.M. occasionally adding additional arrangement. Both members feature as vocalists, and Tōyama also performs guitar in the band.

Throughout 2008, the band entered music competitions, and applied to record company auditions. The band began performing lives in late August 2010, and released their debut single "Postman John" in September. The band's debut album, Zoo & Lennon was released a month later in October 2010, under independent label Evol Records' sub-label, Actwise.

The band released an extended play, Ethnofunky Dostoyevsky Comecome Club EP, in August 2010, and at the same time Tōyama began writing a column for alternative magazine Skream!. The band's Ichi-bō Ni-bō San-bō Yon-bō Go-bō Roku-bō, Tōyō no Techno. was released in May 2011, preceded by the single "Machizō, Machiko, Hakai" in March 2011. These two releases were the first to chart on Oricons singles and albums chart, reaching numbers 72 and 80 respectively. 

In 2017, they announced that they were to end their activities together after a series of live shows.

Discography

Albums

Extended plays

Singles

References

External links 

 0.8Syooogeki official site 

Japanese rock music groups
Musical groups established in 2008
Musical groups disestablished in 2017